

229001–229100 

|-bgcolor=#f2f2f2
| colspan=4 align=center | 
|}

229101–229200 

|-bgcolor=#f2f2f2
| colspan=4 align=center | 
|}

229201–229300 

|-id=255
| 229255 Andrewelliott ||  || Andrew John Elliott (1946–2010), a British observer who pioneered the use of low-light devices, precision timing and video methods in observing short-lived phenomena. || 
|}

229301–229400 

|-bgcolor=#f2f2f2
| colspan=4 align=center | 
|}

229401–229500 

|-id=425
| 229425 Grosspointner ||  || Peter Grosspointner (born 1960), a well-known Austrian amateur astronomer and treasurer of the Astronomischer Arbeitskreis Salzkammergut, one of Austria's largest astronomical societies. || 
|-id=440
| 229440 Filimon ||  || Erwin Filimon (born 1959), a well-known Austrian amateur astronomer and long-term Chairman of the Astronomischer Arbeitskreis Salzkammergut, one of Austria's largest astronomical societies. || 
|}

229501–229600 

|-bgcolor=#f2f2f2
| colspan=4 align=center | 
|}

229601–229700 

|-id=614
| 229614 Womack ||  || Maria P. Womack (born 1963) is an American astronomer at the University of Central Florida. She has made important spectroscopic contributions to understanding the chemical composition and onset of cometary activity. || 
|-id=631
| 229631 Cluny ||  || The city of Cluny is in the Saône-et-Loire department (Burgundy, France), 20 km north west of Mâcon. || 
|}

229701–229800 

|-id=723
| 229723 Marcoludwig ||  || Marco Ludwig (born 1982), a German amateur astronomer and head of the Volkshochschule Observatory in Neumünster || 
|-id=737
| 229737 Porthos ||  || Porthos, a fictional character in Dumas' novels The Three Musketeers, Twenty Years After and The Vicomte de Bragelonne.
|-id=762
| 229762 Gǃkúnǁʼhòmdímà ||  || Gǃkúnǁʼhòmdímà is the beautiful aardvark girl of Juǀʼhoan mythology who sometimes appears in stories as a python and sometimes as an elephant. She defends her people and punishes wrongdoers using gǁámígǁàmì spines, a raincloud full of hail, and her magical oryx horn Gǃòʼé ǃHú. The satellite is being named Gǃòʼé ǃHú. || 
|-id=777
| 229777 ENIAC ||  || ENIAC or Electronic Numerical Integrator and Computer, the first general-purpose electronic computer, a Turing-complete, digital computer capable of being reprogrammed to solve a full range of computing problems. || 
|-id=781
| 229781 Arthurmcdonald ||  || Arthur B. McDonald (born 1943) is a Canadian physicist who received the 2015 Nobel Prize for Physics for his discovery of neutrino oscillations, showing that the neutrino has mass. || 
|}

229801–229900 

|-id=836
| 229836 Wladimarinello ||  || Wladimiro Marinello, Italian amateur astronomer and discoverer of minor planets || 
|-id=864
| 229864 Sichouzhilu ||  || Sichouzhilu (Silk Road) was an ancient network of trade and cultural transmission routes that connected Chang'an, China to the Mediterranean Sea. The Chang'an-Tianshan corridor was listed as a World Heritage Site by UNESCO in 2014. || 
|-id=900
| 229900 Emmagreaves ||  || Emma Jane Greaves (born 1976), daughter of British discoverer Norman Falla || 
|}

229901–230000 

|-bgcolor=#f2f2f2
| colspan=4 align=center | 
|}

References 

229001-230000